David Henry Abrahams (born May 3, 2001) is a blind American Paralympic swimmer. He represented the United States at the 2020 Summer Paralympics.

Early life
Abrahams attended Haverford High School in Havertown, Pennsylvania. He earned NISCA All American honors in 2018 and 2019. Abrahams is a member of Harvard University's swim team.

Career
Abraham represented the United States in the men's 100 metre breaststroke SB13 event at the 2020 Summer Paralympics and won a silver medal.

References

2001 births
Living people
American disabled sportspeople
American male freestyle swimmers
American male breaststroke swimmers
American male butterfly swimmers
American male backstroke swimmers
American male medley swimmers
Swimmers from Pennsylvania
Paralympic swimmers of the United States
Paralympic silver medalists for the United States
Paralympic medalists in swimming
Swimmers at the 2020 Summer Paralympics
Medalists at the 2020 Summer Paralympics
Harvard Crimson men's swimmers
People from Haverford Township, Pennsylvania
S13-classified Paralympic swimmers
21st-century American people